"Moody River" is a song written by and originally performed by country rockabilly singer Chase Webster (real name Gary Daniel Bruce, not to be confused with Gary Bruce of The Knack).

Pat Boone recorded and released his own version in May 1961, where it reached number-one on the Billboard Hot 100 chart the following month.  This was the title track from one of Boone's better-selling albums. Boone sang this song as if he were in pain.

Plot
The 'story-song' tells the tale of a man who plans to meet his love on the riverbank, by an old oak tree, but finds her glove and a note for him, indicating she has committed suicide via drowning, "river more deadly, than the veinous knife". The note explains that she had cheated on him and cannot lie about it, "No longer can I live with this hurt and this sin. I just couldn't tell you 'that guy was just a friend'."

He then notices his own reflection in the river, "lonely, lonely face just lookin' back at me", and begins to weep "Tears in his eyes, and a prayer on his lips, and the glove of his lost love, at his fingertips".

"Vainest knife" lyric
Gary Bruce's original lyrics were "more deadly than the SHARPEST knife", but during the recording session the P in "sharPest" kept popping, however, rather than find a different mic or a filter, Chase changed sharpest to "vainest" on the spot. Apparently, very little or no thought went in to the meaning.

When Pat Boone recorded it a couple of months later, Dot Records chief exec, Randy Wood, even verified the lyric before Boone's release.

Chart performance

See also
List of Hot 100 number-one singles of 1961 (U.S.)

References

External links
 Pat Boone at Bear Family Records
 
 "Beachwood Reporter" background and commentary on Moody River

1961 singles
Pat Boone songs
Billboard Hot 100 number-one singles
Number-one singles in Canada
Number-one singles in New Zealand
Songs about suicide
Teenage tragedy songs
1961 songs
Dot Records singles